The Association Sportive de Saint Priest is a French association football team founded in 1945. It is based in Saint-Priest, Rhône, France and plays in the Championnat National 2, having been reprieved from relegation at the end of the truncated 2019–20 season. It plays at the Stade Jacques Joly in Saint-Priest, which was renovated by the town in 2019.

Current squad

References

External links
  
 AS Saint-Priest Supporters Forum 

Association football clubs established in 1945
1945 establishments in France
Sport in Lyon Metropolis
Football clubs in Auvergne-Rhône-Alpes